Bai Hu Tong (also) is a Confucian text based on the  held in 79 CE.

History 

The traditional view of this text is that it was compiled by Ban Gu (32–92 CE) on the orders of the Emperor Zhang of Han (57-88 CE). The discussions covered a broad range of topics including rites, politics, cosmology, and philosophy. Ban Gu is said to have edited the records of these discussions, and from them to have produced the book we have today. Some scholars have suggested that the book may in fact be made up of material produced as late as the 3rd century CE, rather than being the product of Ban Gu's work in recording the discussions of 79.

References

External links
 白虎通德論

Confucian texts